Kamaran Island ( Kamarān) is the largest Yemeni island in the Red Sea. It is a "shelf island" located in the shallow waters of the Arabian peninsula's continental shelf with coral reefs surrounding three sides of the island. The population numbers 2,200.

Kamaran is generally flat, with a few hills in the south. Its highest point is Jabal Yaman (24 meters high), situated about three kilometers from Ra's al Yaman, the southeastern cape of the island.

History 

In 1513, Afonso de Albuquerque spent three months on the island after the abortive siege of Aden. The Portuguese stay was thoroughly unpleasant marked by a short supply of food, a small smattering of only goats and camels, alongside the outbreak of a mysterious epidemic that caused fever and blood clogging.

In 1523 Selman Reis went on an expedition in the Red Sea. During this expedition Selman Reis discovered that the Kamaran Island was occupied recently by the Portuguese,The Portuguese used their base to raid the coast of Arabia, Salman Reis and Husayn al Rumi had an Ottoman force composed of 4,000 men. After their arrival in Yemen, the Ottomans attacked the Portuguese which resulted in the complete destruction and expulsion of Portuguese forces and the occupation of the island by the Ottomans.

During the early months of World War I, there was a debate among the British on the suitability of occupying Kamaran and the other Turkish-held Red Sea islands such as the Farasan Islands. Those who opposed the move pointed out that when war broke out, Great Britain had solemnly declared that it had no territorial ambitions in the area; even a temporary occupation might be seen by the Arabs, particularly the Imam of Yemen, as a breach of that promise. Finally, the decision was taken to occupy Kamaran and on the 9th of June 1915, the RMS Empress of Russia landed an armed party on the island, previously evacuated by the Turkish garrison. G. A. Richardson, formerly vice-consul at Hudaydah and Kamaran, also disembarked to act as Political Officer with additional responsibility for Police, Treasury and Customs. While the British continued to administer Kamaran from Aden, they never declared formal possession.

In 1923, the Treaty of Lausanne, which divided up the defeated Ottoman Empire, declared an end to its sovereignty over the Arabian Peninsula and adjacent islands, whose future was to be "settled by the parties concerned" without specifying those parties. Britain continued to administer the island despite the objections of Yemen which claimed sovereignty over the island. In 1949, Britain formally declared the governor of Aden to be the governor of Kamaran but the island did not become a part of the colony.

Quarantine station

After the departure of the Turks, an international control was exercised over the quarantine station, but it was in fact placed under British administration. In anticipation of a vast increase in the number of the faithful from British India, the Dutch East Indies, etc. who would make the pilgrimage the camp was greatly extended. Long lines of barrack-like sleeping quarters were constructed where the Turks had provided only wattle huts. Big disinfecting plants were installed where the pilgrims went through an ordeal of cleansing on a production line basis. A power station was built. The local water supply being inadequate, a massive distillation plant was introduced to make sea water fit for drinking. There were carpenters’ shops, machine shops, a small railway to transport fuel and stores, a wireless station, a fine landing stage, a cantonment of officials’ bungalows. This proved a bonanza for the islanders. They prospered on this trade in potential disease among the devout, and the population grew. In the village of Kamaran, the only settlement apart from a few isolated groups of fishermen's huts, fine houses and a magnificent mosque went up, and a lively trade in pilgrim requirements was conducted with the mainland.

Norman Lewis describes that, during Thompson's commissionership, resident islanders worked primarily as pearl divers and would rarely last past the age of 50 due to the harsh work-induced stresses.

However, this prosperity was short-lived. Determined to control the pilgrimage in all its aspects, the Saudi Arabian Government decided to construct its own quarantine station and to insist that Kamaran be by-passed. Soon, the long lines of buildings in the camps lay empty and deserted; a handful of men maintained was had become a ghost town while arrangements were debated for its breaking up and disposal.

End of the British presence

On 30 November 1967, Kamaran became a part of the People's Democratic Republic of Yemen (South Yemen) upon its independence from Britain, but was seized by the adjacent Yemen Arab Republic (North Yemen) in 1972 and became a part of a unified Yemen in 1990.

British Commissioners 

 June 1915 - 191.           D.G.L. Shaw - Commander
 c.1922 - 1935              Captain Guy Vyvian Wickham
 1930s - c.1945             David Thompson
 c.1945 - 1952              Major Thomson British Army 1948
 1952 - 1954?               R.G.W.E. Alban   (b. 1899 - d. 19..)
 1954? - 30 November 1967   Archie Wilson

Postal history
Kamaran Island had an Ottoman post office until 1915 and had a sub-post office of Aden beginning in 1924. From 1967, it was a postal territory of South Yemen, from 1972 of North Yemen, and from 1990 of the unified Republic of Yemen.

Notes

Sources and external links
  WorldStatesmen- Yemen
 Kamaran Island page
 Kamaran Island Photo Gallery
 Nigel Groom. The island of two moons: Kamaran 1954. at The British-Yemeni Society webpage
 Small Islands in the Near East

Islands of the Red Sea
Islands of Yemen
Al Hudaydah Governorate
1915 establishments in the British Empire